This is a list of election results for the electoral district of Young in South Australian elections.

Members for Young

Election results

Elections in the 1950s

Elections in the 1940s

Elections in the 1930s

 Preferences were not distributed.

References

South Australian state electoral results by district